Brian Kelly (February 14, 1931 – February 12, 2005) was an American actor widely known for his role as Porter Ricks, the widowed father of two sons on the NBC television series Flipper.

Early years

Kelly was born in Detroit, Michigan, the son of Republican Governor of Michigan Harry F. Kelly (who was also chief justice of Michigan's Supreme Court) and the former Anne Veronica O'Brien. Kelly had three sisters and two brothers, one of whom was his fraternal twin. His nephew (sister's son) is actor Brian d'Arcy James. He was of Irish descent.

Kelly attended St. Mary High School and served in the United States Marine Corps during the Korean War. Kelly graduated in 1953 from the University of Notre Dame in South Bend, Indiana. He attended the University of Michigan Law School in Ann Arbor for a year before settling on acting. During his college years, Kelly modelled and acted in radio and television commercials in Detroit.

Acting career
Kelly headed to Hollywood in the late fifties after choosing acting as his career. Following minor roles in Adventures in Paradise, The Beverly Hillbillies, and The Rifleman, Kelly starred in two television series, NBC's 21 Beacon Street (1959), with Dennis Morgan and Joanna Barnes, and ABC's Straightaway (1961-1962) with John Ashley.

In 1964, Kelly took over the Chuck Connors role from the 1963 family film Flipper, playing Porter Ricks, Chief Warden at Coral Key Park and Marine Preserve and recently-widowed father of Sandy Ricks (Luke Halpin) in the 1964 sequel Flipper's New Adventure.  He continued the role in the family-oriented action and adventure television program Flipper that same year. In the TV series, Porter would also have a second son, Bud (Tommy Norden). Kelly was quoted at the time as saying that he loved the role because of its family-friendly qualities. The success of Flipper, which was filmed in Miami and the Bahamas, led to a brief movie career, including a lead in Around the World Under the Sea (1966).

In 1970, Kelly sought to change his image by playing the role of Robin Stone in The Love Machine, based on the novel by Jacqueline Susann.  Just prior to filming, he was involved in a motorcycle accident which left his right arm and leg paralyzed. John Phillip Law took over the role. Kelly—whom Susann had called "the perfect Robin Stone"—won a legal settlement in the case but the accident ended his acting career.

He used money from the settlement to build homes and then to produce films. He served as executive producer of Blade Runner (1982) and associate producer of Cities of the Wild (1996).

Marriages and death

Kelly was married to actress Laura Devon from 1962 until their 1966 divorce. In 1972, he married Valerie Ann Romero, with whom he had a daughter (Hallie Kelly Star) in 1975, and a son (Devin Kelly) in 1980.

Kelly died two days shy of his 74th birthday on February 12, 2005, of pneumonia in Voorhees Township, New Jersey.

Filmography

Film

Television

Notes

External links

 
 
 
  Brian Kelly Fan Club

1931 births
2005 deaths
Film producers from New Jersey
American male television actors
United States Marine Corps personnel of the Korean War
Deaths from pneumonia in New Jersey
People from Voorhees Township, New Jersey
Male actors from Detroit
Military personnel from Detroit
United States Marine Corps officers
University of Michigan Law School alumni
University of Notre Dame alumni
Film producers from Michigan
20th-century American male actors
Military personnel from New Jersey